Giulio Basletta (5 May 1890 – 5 February 1975) was an Italian fencer. He won a bronze medal at the 1924 Summer Olympics and a gold at the 1928 Summer Olympics.

References

External links
 

1890 births
1975 deaths
Italian male fencers
Olympic fencers of Italy
Fencers at the 1924 Summer Olympics
Fencers at the 1928 Summer Olympics
Olympic gold medalists for Italy
Olympic bronze medalists for Italy
Olympic medalists in fencing
People from Vigevano
Medalists at the 1924 Summer Olympics
Medalists at the 1928 Summer Olympics
Sportspeople from the Province of Pavia